"Lose Control" is a song by American rapper Missy Elliott featuring singer Ciara and rapper Fatman Scoop. It was released as the lead single from Elliott's sixth studio album, The Cookbook, on May 23, 2005. It contains samples from Hot Streak's "Body Work" and Cybotron's "Clear". The song peaked at number three on the Billboard Hot 100 in the United States, number two in New Zealand, and in the top thirty in various countries.

Conception
The song was written by Melissa Elliott, Ciara Harris, Isaac Freeman, Richard Davis and Curtis Hudson and produced by Elliott. The song is an uptempo electronic dance track and contains samples of "Clear" by Cybotron and "Body Work" by Hot Streak, of which Curtis Hudson was a member.

In March 2005, Ciara confirmed she would appear on The Cookbook, singing and rapping on the potential first untitled single at the time. She explained the song's meaning, saying, "It's about music, how music makes you feel and makes you lose control." While recording the song, Elliott stated, "The only person who can pull something off with me [on this track] is Ciara, because it's a record with speed." She went on to say that the toughest part of making the song was convincing Ciara to rap. In the process, Ciara asked Elliott, "Is this gonna sound messed up? My fans are gonna be mad." Along with "On & On", "Lose Control" was released in advance of The Cookbook to determine which song would serve as the lead single.

Critical reception
"Lose Control" received favorable reviews from critics. Virgin Media gave the song four out of five stars, calling the song "irresistibly danceable", saying that the sample was "a great spin on the original Cybotron material." In the album review, John Bush of AllMusic said the song was a "nod to the type of old-school party jam that Elliott does better than ever." Brian Hiatt of Rolling Stone called the song one of the "best tracks" on the album. The song was certified gold by the RIAA.

The video for "Lose Control" was nominated for six MTV Video Music Awards, including Breakthrough Video, Best Direction in a Video, Best Choreography in a Video and Best Special Effects in a Video. It went on to win two, Best Hip-Hop Video and Best Dance Video. It also won a Grammy Award for Best Short Form Music Video, while the song itself received a nomination for Best Rap Song. The video won Best R&B/Soul or Rap Music Video at the Soul Train Lady of Soul Awards and was nominated for The Michael Jackson Award for Best R&B/Soul or Rap Music Video and Best R&B/Soul or Rap Dance Cut at the Soul Train Music Awards. It was also nominated for Video of the Year at the 2006 BET Awards. "Lose Control" was ranked in the top songs of 2005 by Pitchfork Media, where it ranked at number 23, numbers 14 and 49 on the Billboard Hot 100 and the Hot R&B/Hip-Hop Songs, respectively and number 12 on About.com.

Music video
Directed by Dave Meyers, the music video starts off in a solid black room with dancers. Later, Elliott is seen buried in sand and slowly emerges in front of three other dancers. Elliott's head is added digitally to a different body. The next scene is in an old wooden house and in rows of dancers as they continue to dance. After that there are rows of people dancing outside of a building with the people dressed in vintage clothes and the footage filtered to look very old and grainy with some colors flattened and others oversaturated.  They then end up on a desert road near a truck, where a single line of dancers finish dancing. The video then switches over to the song "On & On", where three dancers dance in sand as Elliott dances and levitates over a wooden plank, later accompanied by Tommy Lee. Lee described the act as "cool wire work to fly around". In 2005, the music video for "Lose Control" was the most played video on BET and MTV2 and second most played video in the United States, although many of them edited out the "On & On" section.

Track listings

 US promo CD
 "Lose Control" (radio version) – 3:15
 "Lose Control" (instrumental) – 3:32
 "Lose Control" (explicit album version) – 3:34

 UK 12-inch single
A1. "Lose Control" (explicit version)
A2. "Lose Control" (instrumental version)
B1. "Lose Control" (extended version)

 UK CD and digital download
 "Lose Control" (explicit album version) – 3:30
 "Lose Control" (extended version) – 4:51

 Australian CD single
 "Lose Control" (explicit version)
 "Lose Control" (extended version)
 "Lose Control" (instrumental version)

Personnel
 Marcella Araica – assistant engineer
 Chris Brown – assistant engineer
 Vadim Chislov – assistant engineer
 Paul J. Falcone – mixing
 Eric Jensen – assistant engineer
 Rayshawn Woolard – assistant engineer

Charts

Weekly charts

Year-end charts

Certifications

Release history

References

2005 singles
Missy Elliott songs
Ciara songs
Fatman Scoop songs
Grammy Award for Best Short Form Music Video
Music videos directed by Dave Meyers (director)
Songs written by Ciara
Songs written by Fatman Scoop
Songs written by Missy Elliott
The Goldmind Inc. singles
Atlantic Records singles
2005 songs